Pike Township is a township in Muscatine County, Iowa, in the United States.

History
Pike Township was organized in 1853.

References

Townships in Muscatine County, Iowa
Townships in Iowa
1853 establishments in Iowa